Sylvia Vanden Heede (born in Belgium, 1961) is a Flemish author of children's books. She has been writing since 1985, and has since been recognized internationally by literary awards. She is also known for her work with illustrator Thé Tjong-Khing.

Works
2014 – Hond weet alles en Wolf niets (Lannoo)
2014 – Een afspraakje in het bos (Lannoo)
2013 – De kooi
2013 – Vos en Haas Het spel van Jak (Lannoo)
2013 – Vos en Haas en de seizoenen (Lannoo)
2012 – Vos en Haas, waar is het ijs? (Lannoo)
2012 – Het tweede dikke boek van Vos en Haas (Lannoo)
2011 – Een echt zwijn is stoer (Lannoo)
2011 – Vos en Haas en de bui van Uil (Lannoo)
2011 – Vos en Haas Troep is leuk! (Lannoo)

English translations
2013 – Wolf and Dog, 96pp. (Gecko Press) 
2016 – What Dog Knows, 124pp. (Gecko Press)

Awards
2015 – Vlag en Wimpel award for What Dog Knows
2015 – Zilveren Griffel award
2010 – Vlag en Wimpel award for Wolf and Dog

References

1961 births
Belgian women children's writers
Belgian children's writers
20th-century Belgian women writers
21st-century Belgian women writers
Flemish women writers
Living people
Boekenleeuw winners